Astinus is a genus of assassin bug (family Reduviidae), in the subfamily Harpactorinae.

Species
 Astinus intermedius Miller, 1954
 Astinus m-album (Amyot & Serville, 1843)
 Astinus nebulo Miller, 1941
 Astinus pustulatus Stål, 1863
 Astinus siamensis Distant, 1903

References

Reduviidae
Cimicomorpha genera